Slaytonville is  an unincorporated community in Sebastian County, Arkansas, United States.

Notes

Unincorporated communities in Sebastian County, Arkansas
Unincorporated communities in Arkansas